Come Together is a 1971 Italian-American romantic drama road film directed by Saul Swimmer and starring Tony Anthony, Luciana Paluzzi and Rosemary Dexter.

References

External links

1971 films
1971 romantic drama films
1970s drama road movies
Italian romantic drama films
Italian drama road movies
1970s Italian-language films
English-language Italian films
1970s English-language films
Allied Artists films
Apple Corps
Films scored by Stelvio Cipriani
1971 multilingual films
Italian multilingual films
Films directed by Saul Swimmer
1970s Italian films